MTV Wonder Girls is a television program starring the South Korean girl group Wonder Girls. It was classified as a reality show and ran from 2007 through 2010. MTV Wonder Girls was on for four seasons.

Season 1

Season 1 aired the process that dealt with the debut of the Wonder Girls.  The four members are introduced: Sunye, Hyuna, Sohee, and Sunmi.  A fifth member, Yeeun, is chosen through audition.

Season 2

The Wonder Girls had an opportunity to undergo some special experience. They experienced a restaurant, station program production, the zoo, fashion designer, and MT (Membership Training). The last season when Hyuna appear.

The sub-title for this season is "Season 2: The Wonder Life"

Season 3

The Wonder Girls travel to New York to tour the city, shoot the music video for "Wishing on a Star", have various activities together, and prepare for their first US Concert. This the first season of where Yoobin appears.

The sub-title for this season is "Season 3: Sens in New York"

Season 4

There is a total of just 5 episodes and the first episode was aired through MTV Korea. The five episodes premiered on July 29, 2010 and began airing every Saturday at 8:00PM (KST) from its second episode which aired on August 7.

Season 4 mainly focused on the Wonder Girls’ activities in America and their upcoming World Stage Live in Malaysia performances. You will also be able to see the Wonder Girls moving around in their New York dorm, rehearsing in JYPE America practise rooms and their daily lifestyles.

The footage for World Stage Live in Malaysia is especially significant since they will be the first Korean artist to be performing on that stage. 15,000 people are expected at World Stage Live in Malaysia and the 2 hours concert will also be shown to global viewers numbering 5.5 billion in 154 countries worldwide.

In addition to airing their work onstage, the program railed the girls as they meet local fans and vacation at a resort.

Since Season 1 back in 2006, the MTV Wonder Girls reality series has charted the Wonder Girls from their debut to becoming globally known stars.

Notes

External links 
 MTV "Wonder Girls" Official Website 

MTV
Wonder Girls
South Korean reality television series
Set index articles